Nusret Muslimović (born 25 February 1975) is a Bosnian professional football manager and former player.

As a player, he played for Sloboda Tuzla and Bratstvo Gračanica, while as a manager, Muslimović managed Bratstvo, TOŠK Tešanj and Jedinstvo Brčko.

Managerial statistics

Honours

Player
Bratstvo Gračanica
Second League of FBiH: 2010–11 (North)

References

External links
Nusret Muslimović at footballdatabase.eu

1975 births
Living people
Sportspeople from Tuzla
Association football defenders
Bosnia and Herzegovina footballers
FK Sloboda Tuzla players
NK Bratstvo Gračanica players
Premier League of Bosnia and Herzegovina players
First League of the Federation of Bosnia and Herzegovina players
Bosnia and Herzegovina football managers
NK Bratstvo Gračanica managers
NK TOŠK Tešanj managers
FK Jedinstvo Brčko managers